Pierre-Georges Roy, KCSG, FRSC (23 October 1870 – 4 November 1953) was a Canadian journalist, historian, and archivist.

Born in Lévis, Quebec, Roy was a journalist for the Canadien and the Quotidien. In 1895, he founded the Bulletin des recherches historiques. In 1920, he was appointed the first Chief Archivist of the province of Quebec. He died in 1953 in Lévis.

Honours
In 1919, he was made a Knight Commander of the Order of St. Gregory the Great. In 1927, he was made a Knight of the Legion of Honour.  In 1932, he was awarded the Royal Society of Canada's J. B. Tyrrell Historical Medal.

References

External links

 

1870 births
1953 deaths
Canadian archivists
Chevaliers of the Légion d'honneur
Fellows of the Royal Society of Canada
Knights Commander of the Order of St Gregory the Great
People from Lévis, Quebec
Historians from Quebec